This list of museums in Kansas City, Missouri encompasses museums which are defined for this context as institutions (including non-profit organizations, government entities, and private businesses) that collect and care for objects of cultural, artistic, scientific, or historical interest and make their collections or related exhibits available for public viewing. Also included are non-profit and university art galleries.

Museums

See also 
 List of museums in Missouri
 List of museums in St. Louis
 List of points of interest in Kansas City, Missouri

References 

Kansas City, Missouri
 
Museums